Darvin Edwards (born 11 September 1986) is a Saint Lucian competitor in men's High Jump. Darvin was born in Castries.

Darvin holds the St Lucia National Record for men's High Jump. His career best mark of 2.31m, in Daegu, South Korea at the 2011 IAAF World Championships in Athletics is also the record for the Organisation of Eastern Caribbean States.

Biography

Early years

Darvin attended St Aloysius RC Boys School and then Entrepot Secondary School in Castries. At the latter institution, he was introduced to the High Jump event by coach Gregory Lubin. In 2004, Darvin won the under-20 men’s High Jump at the CARIFTA Games in Hamilton, Bermuda, clearing 2.06m on the opening day. In 2005, the Games were held at the Dwight Yorke Stadium, in Bacolet, Tobago. Darvin had reset the St Lucia National Junior Record at 2.15m a little over a week before the meet. But in the event, he had to settle for joint second, with a best height of 2.05m.

Belgrave Harriers

In 2006, Darvin was selected to represent Saint Lucia at the Commonwealth Games in Melbourne, Australia. He cleared 2.10m and finished seventh in his qualifying group and 13th overall, just missing out on a spot in the final through count back. That year, he opted to travel to London, England, to join the Belgrave Harriers club. There, he was introduced to coach Trevor Llewellyn, who set about totally rebuilding his technique. In the Golden Jubilee Cup Semi-Final, at Eton, Darvin cleared 2.20m on his first trial at that height, setting the Saint Lucia National Record for his event, still shy of his 20th birthday. In the Golden Jubilee Cup Final, Darvin cleared 2.15m to finish third.

Darvin was also introduced to indoor competition during his time in England. In January 2008, competing for Belgrave at Brunel University in Uxbridge, West London, Darvin cleared a career-best (indoors and out) of 2.25m to beat teammate Samson Oni into second place. At the time, Oni co-owned the club's indoor record at 2.27m.

Darvin was called into international action in 2008, for the North American Central American and Caribbean (NACAC) Under-23 Championships in Toluca, Mexico. Darvin established a new career-best outdoors mark of 2.23m to take silver. Jamaal Wilson of The Bahamas, who had beaten Darvin at CARIFTA in 2005, also cleared 2.23 but on this occasion had to settle for bronze. [2]

Injury and Return

After a solid start to 2009, which included clearing 2.22m to win the Aviva Great Britain and United Kingdom Indoor Trials, Darvin suffered a major setback through back injury that kept him out of competition throughout the 2010 season. But when he did come back in 2011, he was entirely back on track, jumping better than ever before.

Darvin began the year clearing a relatively modest 2.20m in indoors competition, winning the South of England AA Championships at Lee Valley. In May, Darvin won his first outdoor competition in the London district of Battersea with a height of 2.27m, breaking the 21-year-old All-Division Southern League Record and clearing his best height indoor or out since 2008, a new National Record.

Just about a month later, in the British Athletics League Division 1 at Barnet Copthall, Darvin went a centimetre further, clearing 2.28m and qualifying to represent Saint Lucia at the IAAF World Championships in Athletics and the Games of the XXX Olympiad in London, England. The height also represented a new Organisation of Eastern Caribbean States record.

World Championships

At the 2011 IAAF World Championships in Athletics, in the South Korean city of Daegu, he was the first man in Group A to clear 2.31m, automatically qualifying for the final, attaining the A standard for the 2012 Olympics and setting a new National Record and OECS Record.

2012 Summer Olympics
Edwards competed at the 2012 Summer Olympics but failed to qualify for the finals.

Honours

Outdoor Progression

External links
World Athletics

References

1986 births
Living people
Saint Lucian high jumpers
Olympic athletes of Saint Lucia
Athletes (track and field) at the 2012 Summer Olympics
Commonwealth Games competitors for Saint Lucia
Athletes (track and field) at the 2006 Commonwealth Games
People from Castries Quarter
Saint Lucian male athletes
Male high jumpers